DKI (Disaster Kleenup International) is the largest organization in North America that contracts for disaster restoration. In June 2013, its annual revenue was $1.7 billion. The organization began franchising in 1994. The organization operates a network that supports its member companies, which operate as independent contractors.

Member companies
The organization  provides a brand for marketing purposes, workshops and training programs, claims support, and marketing initiatives. It   also operates a 24-hour call center that is used by its member companies, customers and insurance companies.

Disaster Kleenup International (Canada) Ltd. operates in Canada. Campbell DKI operates as Campbell Builders, Inc., and has been existent in Columbus, Ohio for over 32 years. Utah Disaster Kleenup is the largest restoration firm in the state of Utah, is based in Draper, Utah, and in 1996 it significantly increased its plant size and equipment base, along with increasing its work force by 29%.

References

Further reading

External links
 

Business services companies of the United States
Business services companies established in 1974
Franchises
1974 establishments in Illinois
Disaster recovery
Companies based in Illinois
Companies based in Utah